The Morgan–Manning House is a historic house located in Brockport, Monroe County, New York.  It was built in 1854 and is a two-story, Italianate–style brick dwelling on a limestone foundation.  The five-by-four-bay main block features a hipped roof and cupola. It has a two-story hipped roof wing with a smaller two-story brick appendage creating a stepped, or telescoping, plan or profile.  The house also has a full width porch with brick piers. The interior features elaborate interior woodwork, period plasterwork, stained glass and decorated ceilings. Also on the property is a contributing carriage house.

The home was originally built for John C. Ostrom and was purchased in 1867 by Dayton S. Morgan and his wife Susan Jocelyn Morgan. Dayton Morgan was a local industrialist whose foundry, the Globe Iron Works, produced the first hundred mechanized reapers for Cyrus McCormick. Mr Morgan went on to produce his own very successful mechanized reapers with business partner William Seymour. The house remained in the Morgan family for almost the next hundred years. The Morgan family remodeled many of the rooms on the main floor of the house in the late Victorian style, embellishing the rooms oak and cherry paneling and trim, and stained glass windows. Dayton Morgan died in 1890. His daughter Sara Morgan married physician Frederick Manning in the 1890s. After the early death of her husband, Mrs. Manning returned to Brockport with her young son Arnold, who died at age 21 in 1916. Sara Morgan Manning stayed on in her parents' house until her death in 1964, at age 96, following a disastrous fire that swept through the house.

Mrs. Manning bequeathed her home to her community. A group of local citizens formed the Western Monroe Historical Society to restore and care for the house, which had become a local landmark. The damage from the fire has been repaired and the house is furnished to reflect the lifestyle of a wealthy canal town resident during the second half of the 19th century, through the first quarter of the 20th century. The Society's collection includes many portraits of locally prominent 19th-century residents and furnishings from local families.

It was listed on the National Register of Historic Places in 1991.  It is designated as a Point of Interest on the Erie Canalway National Heritage Corridor by the National Park Service.

References

External links

National Register of Historic Places profile
Biography of Dayton S. Morgan from History of Rochester and Monroe County New York From the Earliest Historic Times to the Beginning of 1907

Houses on the National Register of Historic Places in New York (state)
Houses in Monroe County, New York
Italianate architecture in New York (state)
Historic house museums in New York (state)
National Register of Historic Places in Monroe County, New York